Waifs and Strays is a short story collection by O. Henry.

Waifs and Strays also may refer to:

 Waifs and Strays (poetry), a book by Micah Ballard
 Waifs and Strays (album), by Ian McNabb
 "Waifs and Strays", a single from Marc Almond's album Enchanted
 Waifs and Strays Society, former name of The Children's Society, an English charity

See also
 Waif and stray - a legal privilege under Anglo-Norman law
 Waif (disambiguation)
 Stray (disambiguation)